Calcium-activated potassium channel subunit beta-1 is a protein that in humans is encoded by the KCNMB1 gene.

Function 

MaxiK channels are large conductance, voltage and calcium-sensitive potassium channels which are fundamental to the control of smooth muscle tone and neuronal excitability. MaxiK channels can be formed by 2 subunits: the pore-forming alpha subunit and the product of this gene, the modulatory beta subunit. Intracellular calcium regulates the physical association between the alpha and beta subunits. Beta subunits (beta 1-4) are highly tissue specific in their expression, with beta-1 being present predominantly on vascular smooth muscle. Endothelial cells are not known to express beta-1 subunits. Beta-1 is also known to be expressed in urinary bladder and in some regions of the brain. Association of the beta-1 subunit with the BK channel increases the apparent Ca2+ sensitivity of the channel and decreases voltage dependence.

See also 
 BK channel
 Voltage-gated potassium channel

References

Further reading 
 
 
 
 
 
 
 
 
 
 
 
 
 
 
 
 
 
 
 

Ion channels